Francis Leke may refer to:

Francis Leke (MP) (died 1580), English politician
Francis Leke, 1st Earl of Scarsdale (1581–1655)
Sir Francis Leke, 1st Baronet (1627–1679), MP for Nottinghamshire
Sir Francis Leke, 2nd Baronet (died 1681) of the Leke baronets

See also
Leke (disambiguation)